The Shanyue (山越)  were an ancient conglomeration of upland Yue hill tribes living in what is today the mountainous regions of  Southern China and Northern Vietnam during the Han dynasty. Since the Southern part of China was not yet controlled by the Han Empire (the Han court only claimed ownership of the lands, but lacked the power to control them in reality), the Shanyue people would perform regular rebellions against Han citizens to gather living essentials. The tribe became powerful during the Eastern Han and the period of the end of the Eastern Han, the Shanyue were absorbed into Han Empire after the Sun family established a strong local government on Jiangdong.

The Kingdom of Wu, founded by Sun Quan, launched numerous campaigns against the Shanyue, but to no avail because the tribesmen of Shanyue had lived in the hills for generations and knew the area well, and would go into hiding once they lost a battle. However, one of the Wu generals, Ling Tong, attempted a different approach to deal with the Shanyue tribe, he proposed that Sun Quan should attempt to win the hearts of the Shanyue peoples and assimilate them instead of purely using military force to hamper them. Ling reasoned that if they could impress the Shanyue with Wu's dignity and potential rewards, the tribesmen would submit to their government without bloodshed. After he was granted the authority to request material from counties when required, Ling Tong led a unit with decorative weapons and armors to go deep into the hills. When the Shanyue discovered Wu troops, they were impressed by Ling Tong’s unit; then Ling Tong came out and told them if they would join the Wu forces, handsome rewards would be offered. Tens of thousands of the Shanyue came out from their caves and joined Ling. Ling selected 10,000 strong men to form a unit, and returned. Because of Ling Tong’s success, Zhuge Ke, another Wu general, would adopt his strategy. In AD 234, Ke proposed to Sun Quan that the Shanyue of Danyang could be subdued, and he just needed full powers to implement his plan. Zhuge's requests were granted, and upon Zhuge's arrival, he requested the four neighboring commanderies to seal their borders and not combat the Shanyue; then, when the rice became ready for harvest, he had the rice harvested quickly and then gathered up, away from the pillaging Shanyue. The Shanyue were thus starved into submission (the Shanyue gathered food by plundering the Han people instead of planting themselves), and as soon as they submitted, Zhuge Ke treated them with kindness. The operation was run for 3 to 4 years, and virtually all Shanyue within Dangyang surrendered to Wu.

See also 
 Baiyue
 Âu Lạc
 Dong'ou Kingdom
 Lạc Việt
 Minyue
 Nam Việt
 Qin's campaign against the Yue tribes
 Southward expansion of the Han dynasty

References

3rd-century Asian people
Baiyue
Wu (region)
Yue (state)
Eastern Wu